Robert Baberske (1 May 1900 – 27 March 1958) was a German cinematographer. Although he worked briefly in Britain, Baberske spent most of his career in the German film industry. Baberske began as an assistant to Karl Freund. He became a prominent film technician during the silent era, and later during the Nazi years. Following the Second World War, he lived and worked in East Germany on a number of propaganda films for the state-controlled DEFA studio.

Selected filmography
 Madame Wants No Children (1926)
 Berlin: Symphony of a Metropolis (1927)
 Doña Juana (1927)
 Out of the Mist (1927)
 A Knight in London (1929)
 Napoleon at St. Helena (1929)
 Bookkeeper Kremke (1930)
 Dolly Gets Ahead (1930)
 Calais-Dover (1931)
 Ronny (1931)
 No More Love (1931)
 The Street Song (1931)
 Thea Roland (1932)
 The Beautiful Adventure (1932)
 You Don't Forget Such a Girl (1932)
 The Song of Night (1932)
 Things Are Getting Better Already (1932)
 The Burning Secret (1933)
 Spies at Work (1933)
 Little Girl, Great Fortune  (1933)
 The Sun Rises (1934)
 The Higher Command (1935)
 One Too Many on Board (1935)
 Make Me Happy (1935)
 The Girl Irene (1936)
 Carousel (1937)
The Chief Witness (1937)
 A Night in May (1938)
 The Girl of Last Night (1938)
 Her First Experience (1939)
 How Do We Tell Our Children? (1940)
 Between Hamburg and Haiti (1940)
 The Rothschilds (1940)
 Attack on Baku (1942)
 Between Heaven and Earth (1942)
 Kohlhiesel's Daughters (1943)
 The Buchholz Family (1944)
 Marriage of Affection (1944)
 King of Hearts (1947)
 The Cuckoos (1949)
 How Do We Tell Our Children? (1949)
 Bürgermeister Anna (1950)
 The Axe of Wandsbek (1951)
 Das tapfere Schneiderlein (1956)

References

Bibliography
 Bock, Hans-Michael & Bergfelder, Tim. The Concise CineGraph. Encyclopedia of German Cinema. Berghahn Books, 2009.

External links

1900 births
1958 deaths
German cinematographers
Film people from Berlin